Balkot may refer to: 
Balkot, Lumbini, a town in southern Nepal
Balkot, Bagmati, a village and Village Development Committee in central Nepal